Susan District is a district (bakhsh) in Izeh County, Khuzestan Province, Iran. At the 2006 census, its population was 16,539, in 2,871 families. The district has no cities. The district has two rural districts (dehestan): Susan-e Gharbi Rural District and Susan-e Sharqi Rural District.

References 

Izeh County
Districts of Khuzestan Province